John Schneider may refer to:

Arts and entertainment
 John Schneider (guitarist) (born 1950), American classical music guitarist
 John Schneider (producer) (born 1962), American film producer
 John Schneider (screen actor) (born 1960), American actor and country music singer
 John Schneider (stage actor), Milwaukee-based theatre artist

Politics
 John Schneider Jr. (1918–1985), American politician
 John D. Schneider (1937–2017), American politician
 John R. Schneider (1937–2002), American politician

Sports
 John Schneider (American football player) (1894–1957), American football wingback
 John Schneider (American football executive) (born 1971), Seattle Seahawks executive
 John Schneider (baseball) (born 1980), American baseball coach
 John Schneider (Canadian football) (born 1945), Canadian football quarterback
 John Schneider (racing driver), American racing driver

Others
 John A. Schneider (born 1926), president of the CBS Television Network
 John Brand Schneider, engineer
 John Henry Powell Schneider, merchant in London
 John Metz Schneider (1859–1942), Canadian businessman and founder of Schneider Foods

See also
 John Snyder (disambiguation)